The United States Bankruptcy Court for the District of Arizona is the United States bankruptcy court in Arizona; it is associated with the United States District Court for the District of Arizona.

Judges

 James Marlar, Chief Judge
 Redfield T. Baum
 Charles G. Case II
 Sarah Sharer Curley
 Randolph J. Haines
 Eileen W. Hollowell
 George B. Nielsen, Jr.

External links
 Arizona Bankruptcy Court — official site

Arizona law
Arizona
Courts and tribunals with year of establishment missing